World Press Photo Foundation is an independent, non-profit organization based in Amsterdam, Netherlands. Founded in 1955, the organization is known for holding an annual press photography contest. Since 2011, World Press Photo has organized a separate annual contest for journalistic multimedia productions, and, in association with Human Rights Watch, the annual Tim Hetherington Grant.

Objectives
A primary objective of the organization is to support professional photojournalism on a wide international scale through the World Press Photo Academy. It aims to stimulate developments in photojournalism, encourage the transfer of knowledge, help develop high professional standards in visual journalism and promote a free and unrestricted exchange of information. It organizes a number of educational projects throughout the world: seminars, workshops and the annual Joop Swart Masterclass.

Award ceremony
An annual awards ceremony is held in the Oude Kerk in Amsterdam. After the contest, the prizewinning photographs are assembled into a travelling exhibition. A yearbook presenting all prizewinning entries is published annually in six languages.

In addition to selecting the World Press Photo of the Year, the contest determines winners in the following other categories: Spot News, General News, People, Sports, Contemporary Issues, Daily Life, Portraits and Nature.

Recent winners

New York-based photographer Spencer Platt of Getty Images won in 2006. His picture showed a group of young Lebanese driving through a South Beirut neighborhood devastated by Israeli bombings. The picture was taken on 15 August 2006, the first day of the ceasefire between Israel and Hezbollah when thousands of Lebanese started returning to their homes.

In 2007, a total of 4,460 professional photographers from 124 countries entered 78,083 images in the competition. The winner was the British photographer Tim Hetherington.

In 2008,  Anthony Suau, of USA, won the World Press Photo of the Year for the second time (the first was in 1987).

Amit Sha'al of Israel won third prize in 2011 in the category of Arts and Entertainment: Stories. During an exhibit in Lebanon that year, World Press Photo was asked to remove Sha'al's photos because, according to the General Security Directorate, Lebanon and Israel were "in a state of war." WPP refused to censor the Israeli artist and shut down the exhibit ten days ahead of schedule.

Exhibitions

In November 2017, the World Press Photo Foundation held its largest US exhibition ever, in Washington, DC's Dupont Circle's Dupont Underground art space.

Joop Swart Masterclass

Since 1994 World Press Photo has organised the Joop Swart Masterclass, where photojournalists who are considered notable are selected to mentor a group of young photographers.

References

External links

Slideshows of World Press Photo winners, 2005–the present, at LensCulture
World Press Photo Winners 2005 at the BBC
World Press Photo Winners 2004 at the BBC
World Press Photo Exhibition in Amsterdam's Oude Kerk, May 2013 (Video)

Photography awards
Non-profit organisations based in the Netherlands
Organisations based in the Netherlands with royal patronage
Organisations based in Amsterdam
1955 establishments in the Netherlands
Organizations established in 1955
Photography exhibitions